Alexandrium tamarense is a species of dinoflagellates known to produce saxitoxin, a neurotoxin which causes the human illness clinically known as paralytic shellfish poisoning (PSP). Multiple species of phytoplankton are known to produce saxitoxin, including at least 10 other species from the genus Alexandrium.

Recent molecular work shows that this species belongs to the Alexandrium tamarense complex (Atama complex, including A. tamarense, Alexandrium fundyense, Alexandrium catenella) and that none of the three original morphospecies designations forms monophyletic groups in the present SSU-based and previous LSU-based phylogenetic trees, i.e. these species designations are invalid.
There is docosahexaenoic acid along with saxitoxin.

References

Further reading
 
 
 

Gonyaulacales